Aisin Gioro Bartu (巴尔图, 12 September 1674 - 10 April 1753) was Qing dynasty imperial prince as Giyesu's fourth son and fifth-generation descendant of Daišan, Nurhaci's second son. Bartu was the last Prince Kang of the First Rank as his peerage was renamed back to "Prince Li of the First Rank" in commemoration of Daishan's contribution to establishment of the Qing dynasty.

Life 
Bartu was born on 12 September 1674 to secondary princess consort Kangliang of the first rank, lady Sakda. In 1733, Bartu succeeded the Prince Kang of the First Rank peerage after the death of Chong'an.

Involvement in the coup of Hongxi 
In 1739, Hongxi (2nd in Prince Li of the First Rank peerage, Yunreng's son) formed a faction together with Hongsheng (son of Prince Heng of the First Rank Yunqi), Prince Ning of the Second Rank Hongjiao (son of Prince Yi of the First Rank Yinxiang), Hongchang, Yunlu and Hongpu (son of Prince Zhuang of the First Rank Yunlu) aiming to oust Qianlong Emperor from power and support Hongxi's succession to the imperial throne. The faction failed to achieve its aim as Hongpu dispatched a messenger to report an urgent matter to the emperor, who resided at that time in Rehe. Hongpu was arrested at the Copper Wall by imperial guards. After the imperial hunt, all the factionists were temporarily imprisoned at the Imperial Clan Court, where the trial was held. One of the persons interrogating rebelliants was Bartu, who was entrusted with the affairs of the imperial clan court. The princes being underlings of Hongxi were stripped of their title and imprisoned (Hongxi, Hongsheng, Hongchang), deprived of the allowance (Hongjiao) or demoted, e.g. Hongpu, who was demoted to grace defender duke. The proper decree was drafted by Bartu and Zhang Tingyu, one of the most prominent officials of the Qianlong era.

Court career 
In 1748, Bartu was sent to the Imperial Ancestral Temple to conduct sacrificial rites. In 1749 and in 1751, Bartu was sent to Temple of Heaven to pray for harvest. In 1749, Bartu made sacrifices at the Temple of Earth. In 1752, he was dismissed of attending court sessions due to serious illness. Bartu died of illness at the age of 79 on 10 April 1753 and was posthumously honoured as "Prince Kangjian of the First Rank" (和硕康简亲王)

Family
Bartu was married to Lady Ezhuo, daughter of Qishan (奇山). His second primary consort was the sister of the previous one. Bartu had in summary 24 sons and at least one daughter, whose marriage was held in 1765. The number of children he had was one of the greatest among the Qing dynasty royalty (Kangxi Emperor had in summary 55 children, Shanqi had 38 children).

 Primary consort, of the Ezhuo clan
 Supporter general Mozhang (奉国将军谋章, 1698–1762),first son
 Second primary consort, of the Ezhuo clan
 Mocheng (谋成, 1708-1711), third son
 Supporter general Moben (奉国将军谋本, 1712-1759), fourth son
 Mohong (谋宏, 1714–1730), fifth son
 Mowen (谋文, 1717–1748), sixth son
 Mosheng (谋声, 1719-1721), seventh son
 Moyun (谋云, 1721-1764), eighth son
 Secondary consort, of the Zhou clan, daughter of Sige (四格)
 Modian (辅国将军谋典, 1736-1793), fifteenth son
 First class bulwark general Moguang (一等辅国将军谋广, 1737-1766), seventeenth son
 Mojian (谋建1738-1741), nineteenth son
 Secondary consort, of the Xia clan, daughter of Xia Liu（夏六）
 Motai (谋泰, 1735-1738), twelfth son
 Morui (谋瑞, 1736-1747), sixteenth son
 Second class bulwark general Moxian (二等辅国将军谋显, 1738-1788),twelfth son
 Third class defender general Moliang (三等镇国将军谋亮, 1740-1796), 23rd son
 Secondary consort, of the Xia clan, daughter of Shihou（世侯）
 Secondary consort, of the Li clan, daughter of Li Xin (李新)
 Moling (谋灵, 1740-1741), 22th son
 Mistress, of the Zhou clan, daughter of Zhou Liu (周六)
 Mocun (谋存, 1701–1719), second son
 Mistress, of the Shen clan, daughter of Sange (三格)
 Moshou (谋寿, 1735-1739), ninth son
 Mistress, of the Shen clan, daughter of Shen Da (申达)
 Moyao (谋耀, 1735-1736), eleventh son
 Mohao (谋浩, 1740-1744), 24th son
 Mistress, of the Xia clan, daughter of Sige (四格)
 Supporter general Mogong (奉国将军谋恭, 1735-1777),thirteenth son
 Mistress, of the Han clan
 Supporter general Mojing (奉国将军谋经, 1735-1770), fourteenth son
 Moshun (谋顺, 1737-1754), eighteenth son
 Mistress, of the Gao clan
 Moxun (谋勋, 1739-1741), 21st son
 Mistress, of the Zhang clan (妾張氏)
 Mistress, of the Wu clan (妾吳氏)
 Mistress, of the Li clan (妾李氏), daughter of Zhimao (芝茂)
 Mistress, of the Xiong clan (妾熊氏)
 Moyu (谋裕, 1735–1737), tenth son

References 

1674 births
1753 deaths
Qing dynasty imperial princes
Prince Li